Daviesia dilatata is a species of flowering plant in the family Fabaceae and is endemic to the south-west of Western Australia. It is an erect, open, glabrous shrub with scattered, often sickle-shaped phyllodes, and orange, red, yellow and dark crimson flowers.

Description

Taxonomy and naming
Daviesia dilatata was first formally described in 1995 by Michael Crisp in the journal Australian Systematic Botany from specimens collected near Ravensthorpe in 1979. The specific epithet (dilatata) means "enlarged", referring to the phyllodes that widen upwards.

Distribution and habitat
This species of pea grows in heath and tall shrubland between Nyabing, Bremer Bay and Cape Arid National Park in the Esperance Plains, Jarrah Forest and Mallee biogeographic regions of south-western Western Australia.

Conservation status
Daviesia dilatata is classified as "not threatened" by the Western Australian Government Department of Biodiversity, Conservation and Attractions.

References

dilatata
Eudicots of Western Australia
Plants described in 1995
Taxa named by Michael Crisp